A Lesson in Love is a 1954 Swedish comedy film directed by Ingmar Bergman.

The film is about the marriage of a gynecologist named David and his wife Marianne. The film's score was composed by Dag Wirén.

Cast
 Eva Dahlbeck – Marianne Erneman
 Gunnar Björnstrand – David Erneman
 Yvonne Lombard – Susanne Verin
 Harriet Andersson – Nix
 Åke Grönberg – Carl-Adam
 Olof Winnerstrand – Professor Henrik Erneman
 Renée Björling – Svea Erneman
 John Elfström – Sam
 Birgitte Reimer – Lise
 Dagmar Ebbesen – Nurse Lisa
 Sigge Fürst – Vicar

Reception
A Lesson in Love received generally positive reviews from film critics. Review aggregator Rotten Tomatoes reports 100% approval (based on six critics), with an average rating of 7.2/10.

On the film's U.S. release in 1960, Bosley Crowther opined in The New York Times, that its subject "...is the complexity of love...It is a subject that Mr. Bergman expanded in his subsequent "Smiles of a Summer Night," with more wit and satiric implication. But, for a warm-up, he got off nicely here...Mr. Bergman plays around with it in such a clever and thought-provoking way that the emotional dilemma implicit in it has humor, wisdom and charm...And, as in all of his pictures, Mr. Bergman has used a cast that seems to act with inspired understanding—which means, of course, sympathy with him. "

References

External links

1954 films
1954 comedy films
Swedish black-and-white films
Films directed by Ingmar Bergman
Films with screenplays by Ingmar Bergman
Swedish comedy films
1950s Swedish-language films
Films scored by Dag Wirén
1950s Swedish films